Estômago (Portuguese for stomach), or Estômago, a Gastronomic Story, is a 2007 Brazilian–Italian film directed by Marcos Jorge. The film won several awards. It was shot in several locations of Curitiba, Paraná.

Plot
The film shows in parallel two periods in the life of Raimundo Nonato (João Miguel): one follows his successful career as a cook, the other as a prisoner in a cell with about ten other convicts. It gradually becomes clear that these events happen after the former.

His period as a cook starts when he arrives by bus in a big city, without a place to sleep nor money for food. After eating chicken snacks in a cafeteria, he has to wash the dishes to pay for it and is eventually offered a job, receiving merely food and lodging as payment, even though the snacks he cooks are so good it attracts more customers. Nonato falls in love with Íria, a gluttonous prostitute, who offers her services in exchange for food. He also gets a better job in an Italian restaurant, where he learns more of cooking from his boss Giovanni. One day he finds Giovanni having sex with Íria, despite he having proposed to her earlier. Enraged, he steals and drinks from his boss' prized wine collection, before murdering them both and cannibalizing a slice of meat removed from Íria's buttocks.

In the prison cell there is a power hierarchy with Bujiú (Babu Santana) at the top. The food is poor, and Nonato is assigned to cook better food. The inmates are usually quite satisfied with it, and  Nonato rises in the hierarchy. However, Bujiú rejects Gorgonzola, raw meat, and cooked ants, much to Raimundo's frustration. When top-criminal Etcetera, who is highly regarded by the inmates, arrives, Bujiú decides that a great meal should be cooked to please him. The main prison kitchen is arranged for the occasion, an event which Nonato takes advantage of to poison Bujiú, ultimately leading to him becoming the leader of his cell.

Cast
 João Miguel as Nonato
 Fabiula Nascimento as Íria
 Babu Santana as Bujiú
 Alexander Sil as Lino
 Carlo Briani as Giovanni
 Zeca Cenovicz as Zulmiro
 Paulo Miklos as Etcetera
 Jean Pierre Noher as Duque
 Andrea Fumagalli as Francesco

References

External links

2007 films
2000s Portuguese-language films
Films shot in São Paulo
Films shot in Curitiba
Brazilian comedy-drama films
Cooking films
Italian comedy films